

Yemeni League Clubs

2nd Level

Al-Eli Hamudi (Hadiboh)
Al-Wufaa (Aden)
Al-Wahda (Aden)
May 22 San'a'
Salam (al-Garfa)
Al-Shula
Shabah Al Jeel

Yemen
 
Football clubs
Football